Nina Eichinger (born 16 September 1981) is a German television presenter and actress.

Eichinger was born in Munich, the daughter of film producer and director Bernd Eichinger. She was an MTV VJ and has been a jury member for Deutschland sucht den Superstar, seasons 6 and 7. However, she missed the final of season 7 after being stuck in Los Angeles following flight restrictions as a result of the 2010 eruptions of Eyjafjallajökull. She also played roles in The Three Musketeers (2011 film), The Baader Meinhof Complex and other movies.

References

External links 

1981 births
Living people
Television people from Munich
German television actresses
German television presenters
University of San Diego alumni
VJs (media personalities)
German film actresses
German women television presenters